Panorama (Diario Panorama) is a Venezuelan newspaper based in Maracaibo in the state of Zulia. It was established on 1 December 1914. In 2009 Patricia Pineda Hernández took over the directorship of Panorama from her father, Esteban Pineda Belloso, who had directed the business for over 42 years.

See also
 List of newspapers in Venezuela

References

External links
Official website

Mass media in Maracaibo
Newspapers published in Venezuela
Publications established in 1914
Spanish-language newspapers